Splitlog Church (also known as Cayuga Mission Church) is a historic church building in Grove, Oklahoma.

It was built in 1893 and added to the National Register of Historic Places in 1972 with NRIS number.72001061.

Church construction
It has a tall tower and steeple above the front entrance, and a smaller tower above the back of the building. The roof is high and steeply sloped. Limestone steps lead to the front entrance, which has plain wooden double doors, and has an arch adorned with fifteen Indian symbols. The meaning of the symbols is unknown.

Inside, the building has imported wood, much of which has been carved very ornately. All windows are arched and have stained glass. Starting at the east end of the altar, each arched window has one letter of the designer's surname carved above it. Thus, running down the right side of the nave, across the back, and returning up the left, the carvings form the word S-P-L-I-T-L-O-G. The organ that Splitlog had ordered for the choir loft could not be delivered until the church was nearly complete.

Matthias was working under time pressure, because his wife was suffering from an inoperable cancer. He wanted to have the church finished during her lifetime, so she could enjoy his memorial to her. Unfortunately, it was not to be.

Biography of Matthias Splitlog
The church was built by Matthias Splitlog who had come to Indian Territory in 1874, when he was about 62 years old. By the time he started building the church building named for him, he had already outlived his wife and nine of his ten children. Family stories said that he was of mixed ancestry, half Cayuga and half French, and born in the state of New York in 1812. According to his grandson, when he was only three years old, he was taken to Ohio, with most of the other Cayugas. The family story goes on to say that Matthias lived among the Wyandottes in Sandusky, Ohio as a young man when he married a Wyandotte woman, thus becoming a member of her tribe. A group of 700 to 800 Wyandottes emigrated to Kansas Territory in 1843, where they had been assigned  on the Neosho River. The tribal leaders decided that this tract for their new home, so they bought a tract of 39 sections lying between the Kansas and Missouri Rivers. (The site of present-day Kansas City.). Although Matthias could neither read nor write, he reportedly could speak seven languages. He was also noted of his mechanical abilities. In Kansas, Matthias revealed himself to be a shrewd businessman. He built the first gristmill in Kansas, and he also built his own steamboat to carry small loads on the river. His land holdings were in the community of Westport, which had become the starting point for numerous wagon trains headed west. A company of speculators calling themselves, the Wyandotte City Company, began buying land around Westport in 1857. Matthias decided to hold out for a higher price and continued living on the land until 1860. When the Civil War broke out, he enlisted in the Union Army and ferried materiel until he was captured by the Confederates. He was paroled, and returned to Kansas.

Move to Indian Territory
In 1863, the Union Pacific Railroad wanted to cross his land near the river and also build machine shops there. Matthias later said that he was paid a fabulous sum for the property. White settlers soon realized that the Wyandotte land was too valuable to let it remain in Native American hands and began pressuring the Government for their removal. In 1855, they discarded their treaty and tribal rights, to become citizens of the United States, with the same immunities and privileges of white people, including the right to sell their lands. Years before, the Wyandottes had given the Senecas  of land on the Sandusky River in Ohio.  The Wyandottes sold their Kansas properties and moved southwest. Initially, Matthias Splitlog stayed behind, but soon his friends began writing letters for him to join them in their new homeland. He had bought another parcel of land and constructed a new home in 1870. By 1874, Matthias had sold most of his property and journeyed to Indian Territory. He found a suitable tract between the Grand River and the Cowskin River, near the present day city of Grove, Oklahoma. The property included a large spring that he named Cayuga, in honor of his original tribe.

Matthias immediately set to work on a variety of building projects. First he constructed a sawmill, then he built a gristmill and a large blacksmith shop. He also established a ferry and a general store. His building projects employed many local people, paid good wages, and treated the employees well. After completing his own home, he built a factory to make buggies, two-seated hacks and coffins. He named the growing town Cayuga Springs. In 1884, a Cayuga post office was established, with one of Matthias' sons, Joseph, as postmaster. Since there were no public schools, Splitlog provided a building and started a subscription school for the community's children.

Fate of Cayuga Springs
John Wesley Morris wrote a brief description of Cayuga Springs and its church. In it, he said that the village burned in 1913. Only the church, the priest's house and the carriage factory remained. Destroyed structures included a hotel, general store, post office, blacksmith shop and eight or ten dwellings.

However, membership declined as Cayuga's residents moved away, and the Church found it very difficult to supply priests to serve this mission, so the parish was dissolved. The confessional, the altar and certain other Catholic-specific items were removed and taken to other churches. The bell was taken down and sent to St. Catherine's church in Nowata, Oklahoma.

In 1930, an individual person bought the church for sentimental reasons, agreeing to maintain the building and cemetery.

Notes

References

Churches in Oklahoma
Churches on the National Register of Historic Places in Oklahoma
Churches completed in 1893
Buildings and structures in Delaware County, Oklahoma
National Register of Historic Places in Delaware County, Oklahoma